Rupicapnos is a genus of flowering plants belonging to the family Papaveraceae.

Its native range is Western Mediterranean.

Species:

Rupicapnos africana 
Rupicapnos longipes 
Rupicapnos muricaria 
Rupicapnos numidica 
Rupicapnos ochracea 
Rupicapnos sarcocapnoides

References

Papaveraceae
Papaveraceae genera